The 1935 Chicago Cubs season was the 64th season for the Chicago Cubs franchise, the 60th in the National League and the 20th at Wrigley Field. The season saw the Cubs finish with 100 wins for the first time in 25 years; they would not win 100 games in another season until 2016. The Cubs won their 14th National League pennant in team history and faced the Detroit Tigers in the World Series, but lost in six games.

The 1935 season is largely remembered for the Cubs' 21-game winning streak. The streak began on September 4 with the Cubs 2.5 games out of first place. They would not lose again until September 28. The streak propelled the Cubs to the National League pennant. The 21-game winning streak tied the franchise and major league record set in 1880 when they were known as the Chicago White Stockings.

Regular season 
Gabby Hartnett was the first National League catcher to win the MVP Award.

Season standings

Record vs. opponents

Roster

Player stats

Batting

Starters by position 
Note: Pos = Position; G = Games played; AB = At bats; H = Hits; Avg. = Batting average; HR = Home runs; RBI = Runs batted in

Other batters 
Note: G = Games played; AB = At bats; H = Hits; Avg. = Batting average; HR = Home runs; RBI = Runs batted in

Pitching

Starting pitchers 
Note: G = Games pitched; IP = Innings pitched; W = Wins; L = Losses; ERA = Earned run average; SO = Strikeouts

Other pitchers 
Note: G = Games pitched; IP = Innings pitched; W = Wins; L = Losses; ERA = Earned run average; SO = Strikeouts

Relief pitchers 
Note: G = Games pitched; W = Wins; L = Losses; SV = Saves; ERA = Earned run average; SO = Strikeouts

1935 World Series

Game 1 
October 2, 1935, at Navin Field in Detroit

Game 2 
October 3, 1935, at Navin Field in Detroit

Game 3 
October 4, 1935, at Wrigley Field in Chicago

Game 4 
October 5, 1935, at Wrigley Field in Chicago

Game 5 
October 6, 1935, at Wrigley Field in Chicago

Game 6 
October 7, 1935, at Navin Field in Detroit

Awards and honors 
Gabby Hartnett, National League MVP

League records 
Billy Herman, National League record, Most doubles in one season by a second baseman (57)

Farm system 

LEAGUE CHAMPIONS: Ponca City

Notes

See also
List of Major League Baseball longest winning streaks

References 
1935 Chicago Cubs season at Baseball Reference

Chicago Cubs seasons
Chicago Cubs season
National League champion seasons
Chicago Cubs